Elriesa Theunissen-Fourie (2 May 1993 – 5 April 2019) was a South African cricketer who played as a right-handed batter and right-arm medium bowler. She appeared in three One Day Internationals and one Twenty20 International for South Africa women's national cricket team in 2013. She played domestic cricket for North West.

She was killed in a road accident in April 2019.

References

External links
 
 

1993 births
2019 deaths
People from Klerksdorp
White South African people
South African women cricketers
South Africa women One Day International cricketers
South Africa women Twenty20 International cricketers
North West women cricketers
Road incident deaths in South Africa